Kruplivnik (in older sources also Koprivnik,  Prekmurje Slovene: Krplivnik) is a village in the Municipality of Grad in the Prekmurje region of northeastern Slovenia.

References

External links
Kruplivnik on Geopedia

Populated places in the Municipality of Grad